Deh-e Tak (also Romanized as Deh Tak; also known as Deh Tark and Ḩoseynābād) is a village in Darreh Doran Rural District, in the Central District of Rafsanjan County, Kerman Province, Iran. At the 2006 census, its population was 15, in 4 families.

References 

Populated places in Rafsanjan County